Henry the Ache is a black-and-white short film burlesque of the 1933 film The Private Life of Henry VIII starring Bert Lahr and Shemp Howard. The comedy was filmed at Van Beuren Studios and released by RKO Radio Pictures on January 26, 1934.

Cast 

Bert Lahr 	... King Henry VIII
 Janet Reade ... Catherine Howard
Monte Collins ... 	Thomas Culpeper
Shemp Howard  ... Artie 
Leni Stengel ... 	Anne of Cleves
 The Girlfriend Trio ... Ladies in Waiting

External links
 
Henry the Ache at threestooges.net

1934 films
American black-and-white films
Films directed by Ray McCarey
RKO Pictures short films
1934 comedy films
Films about capital punishment
Films set in Tudor England
Films about Henry VIII
American parody films
American satirical films
American slapstick comedy films
1930s American films